Chicken Lips is a dance music band and production team from Stafford, England, that includes Andy Meecham and Dean Meredith, both formerly of Bizarre Inc, a band they created in the early 1990s.

Career
Meecham and Meredith began working as Chicken Lips in 1999. Their music is more left-field House than the acid house that dominated in their earlier Bizarre Inc. productions. Their music has also been described as "disco-dub". As producers, they have issued in stream of twelve-inch singles released through the Kingsize label. With the addition of Steve Kotey, owner of Bear Funk Records, the Chicken Lips became a trio.

Meecham has also been involved in side-projects such as The Emperor Machine.

Discography

Albums

 Echoman (2000), Kingsize
 Extended Play (2002), Kingsize
 Body Music – Nite:Life 015 (2003), NRK Nite Life
 DJ-Kicks: Chicken Lips (2003), !K7
 Re-Echoed, Re-Extended and Re-Hashed (2003), Kingsize
 Clicks, Acid 'n' Disco (2005), Trust the DJ
 Making Faces (2006), Adrift
 Show Your Shape (The Best Of Chicken Lips) (2010), Tirk
 Experience Of Malfunction (2010), Lipservice
 "D.R.O.M.P (Remixes)" (2012), Southern Fried Records

Singles

 "Shoe Beast"
 "Git Back"
 "Jerk Chicken"
 "He Not In"
 "You're Playing Dirty"
 "Blanc Tape"
 "Many Members"
 "Bad Skin"

Remixes

 1999 Meat Katie – "Can't Hear Ya"
 1999 MFA – "Mesmerized"
 1999 Oshun Flow – "HalfLife"
 1999 Riptide – "Got2Get2Gether"
 2000 Bentley Rhythm Ace – "How'd I Do Dat?"
 2000 Utah Saints – "Power to the Beats"
 2001 Nigo – "March of the General"
 2001 Organic Audio – "Nurega"
 2001 Playgroup – "Number One"
 2001 Shrinkwrap – "Illegal Entry"
 2001 Stereo MCs – "We Belong in This World Together"
 2001 Street Corner Symphony – "Memories of Aphrodite"
 2001 Suns of Arqa – "Tomorrow Never Knows"
 2001 The White Rabbit – "Transistor Queen"
 2002 Maurice Fulton presents Stress – "My Gigolo"
 2002 Nile – "To Sir with Love"
 2002 Outcast – "Last Bullet"
 2002 Justin Robertson Presents Revtone – "The Brightest Thing"
 2002 Soul Mekanik Invents Ben-E-Lux – "If U Nu"
 2002 Stylophonic – "Bizarre Mind"
 2002 Underworld – "Dinosaur Adventure 3D"
 2003 Chicks on Speed – "We Don't Play Guitars"
 2003 Will Dawson – "Under the Water"
 2003 FC Kahuna – "Hayling"
 2003 Foolish & Sly – "Rainfalls"
 2003 Jas – "Hitchhiking"
 2003 Headman – "It Rough"
 2003 Land Shark – "Tie Me Up"
 2003 Ennio Morricone – "Teorema"
 2003 Random Factor – "What I Need"
 2003 Rocket – "People"
 2003 Sono – "Heading For"
 2003 Triangle Orchestra – "@ 137"
 2004 Woody Braun – "Finding Words Ain't Easy"
 2004 Nick Holder – "Player 1"
 2004 Ignition – "Love Is War"
 2004 Playgroup – "Make It Happen"
 2004 Wink – "516 Acid"
 2005 Hard-Fi – "Middle Eastern Holiday"
 2005 The Kills – "No Wow"
 2005 Mattafix – "To & Fro"
 2005 Morcheeba – "Wonders Never Cease"
 2005 Plant Life – "The Last Song"
 2006 Alexkid with Liset Alea – "Nightshade"
 2006 Bell X1 – "Flame"
 2006 Clearlake – "Good Clean Fun"
 2006 Sébastien Tellier – "Broadway"
 2006 Tiga – "(Far From) Home"
 2006 Robbie Williams – "Rudebox"
 2007 Chin Chin – "Appetite"
 2007 Tim Fuller – "The Slightest Touch"
 2007 Kotey Extra Band feat. Chaz Jankel – "Sooner or Later"
 2007 Mark Ronson feat. Daniel Merriweather – "Stop Me"
 2007 Next Door But One – "Art Of The Matter"
 2007 Wolfmother – "Love Train"
 2008 Love Is All – "Make Out Fall Out Make Up"
 2008 Pnau – "Embrace"

References

External links
Chicken Lips on Myspace
Discogs: Chicken Lips

English record producers
English DJs
English dance music groups
English electronic music duos
Remixers
Electronic dance music duos